The Women's 50 Backstroke event at the 10th Short Course World Swimming Championships took place 18–19 December 2010 in Dubai, United Arab Emirates. The heats and semifinals were 18 December; the final was 19 December.

73 swimmers swam the event.

Records
Prior to the competition, the existing world and championship records were as follows.

The following records were established during the competition:

Results

Heats

Semifinals

Semifinal 1

Semifinal 2

Final

References

External links
 2010 FINA World Swimming Championships (25 m): Women's 50 m backstroke entry list, from OmegaTiming.com; retrieved 2010-12-16.

Backstroke 050 metre, Women's
World Short Course Swimming Championships
2010 in women's swimming